Farrington Gurney Halt railway station served the village of Farrington Gurney, Somerset, England from 1927 to 1959 on the Bristol and North Somerset Railway.

History 
The station opened on 11 July 1927 by the Great Western Railway. Passengers had to buy their tickets from a tiny office behind the Miner's Arms pub. The station was closed to both passengers and goods traffic on 2 November 1959.

References

External links 

Disused railway stations in Somerset
Former Great Western Railway stations
Railway stations in Great Britain opened in 1927
Railway stations in Great Britain closed in 1959
1927 establishments in England
1959 disestablishments in England